Harry Evans may refer to:

Harry Evans (football manager), British football coach and former manager of Blackpool F.C.
Harry Marshall Erskine Evans (1876–1973), Canadian politician and former mayor of Edmonton, Alberta
Harry Evans (composer) (1873–1914), Welsh composer
Harry Evans (Australian Senate clerk) (1946–2014), Clerk of the Australian Senate
Harry Evans (footballer, born 1919) (1919–1962), English footballer and manager
Harry Evans (Australian footballer) (1879–1949), Australian rules footballer
Harry Congreve Evans (1860–1899), South Australian journalist and editor
Harry Evans (geologist) (1912–1990), Australian geologist
Harry L. Evans (1919–2008), US Air Force general

See also 
Harry Evans Covered Bridge, Mecca, Indiana
Harold Evans (disambiguation)
Henry Evans (disambiguation)